The Villard Houses are a set of former residences comprising a historic landmark at 451–457 Madison Avenue between 50th and 51st Streets in the Midtown Manhattan neighborhood of New York City. Designed by the architect Joseph Morrill Wells of McKim, Mead & White in the Renaissance Revival style, the residences were erected in 1884 for railroad magnate Henry Villard. They comprise a portion of the Lotte New York Palace Hotel, the main tower of which is to the east.

The building comprises six separate residences in a "U"-shaped plan, with wings to the north, east, and south surrounding a courtyard on Madison Avenue. The facade is made of Belleville sandstone, and each house consists of a raised basement, three stories, and an attic. Among the artists who worked on the interiors were artist John La Farge, sculptor Augustus Saint-Gaudens, and painter Maitland Armstrong. Some of the more elaborate spaces, such as the Gold Room, dining room, and reception area in the south wing of the complex, still exist as part of the New York Palace Hotel.

The houses were commissioned by Henry Villard, president of the Northern Pacific Railway, shortly before he fell into bankruptcy. Ownership of the residences changed many times through the mid-20th century. By the late 1940s, the Roman Catholic Archdiocese of New York had acquired all of the houses, except the northernmost residence at 457 Madison Avenue, which it acquired from Random House in 1971. The New York City Landmarks Preservation Commission designated the complex an official landmark in 1968, and the residences were listed on the National Register of Historic Places in 1975. As part of the construction of the New York Palace Hotel, completed in 1980, the north wing was turned into office space for city preservation group Municipal Art Society.

Site
The Villard Houses are in the Midtown Manhattan neighborhood of New York City, bounded by Madison Avenue to the west, 51st Street to the north, and 50th Street to the south. The residences are composed of two land lots. The rest of the residences occupy the same land lot as the Lotte New York Palace Hotel immediately to the east. Nearby buildings include Olympic Tower, 11 East 51st Street, and 488 Madison Avenue to the northwest; St. Patrick's Cathedral to the west; and 18 East 50th Street and the Swiss Bank Tower to the southwest.

Architecture
The Villard Houses complex was designed by architect Joseph M. Wells of McKim, Mead & White. Charles Follen McKim of that firm was responsible for the overall plan, though Wells designed the individual details. The homes are among several projects McKim, Mead & White designed for railroad magnate Henry Villard.

The houses are designed in the Romanesque Revival style with Italian Renaissance touches. The complex was McKim, Mead & White's first major use of the Italian Renaissance style. The design was influenced by Rome's Palazzo della Cancelleria, though some inspiration may have come from the Palazzo Farnese, also in Rome. The two palazzos had been Wells's favorite Renaissance buildings. Architectural writers William Shopsin and Mosette Glaser Broderick have also cited the Palazzo della Farnesina as an influence on the design of the Villard Houses. The houses' design contained some major deviations from those of the Roman palazzos. For example, the Cancelleria's windows were decorated based on internal use, with the most elaborate windows at the piano nobile, while the Villard Houses' windows were decorated based on the floor height, with the most elaborate windows illuminating the guests' and servants' rooms on the top floors.

Layout and courtyard 

The building was erected as six separate residences in a "U"-shaped plan, with three wings surrounding a central courtyard on Madison Avenue. At the time of the houses' completion, they faced a similar courtyard at the eastern end of St. Patrick's Cathedral. The Lady Chapel at the cathedral had not yet been built, so St. Patrick's eastern end was a flat wall flanked by a rectory and an archbishop's house. The Villard courtyard was built to complement St. Patrick's courtyard, which was about the same size.

The south wing consisted of a single residence, Henry Villard's residence at 451 Madison Avenue, also known as 29 East 50th Street. The north wing consisted of three residences at 457 Madison Avenue (which occupied the western two-thirds of that wing) and 24-26 East 51st Street. The eastern end of the south wing had a seven-story tower, while the eastern end of the north wing had a one-and-a-half-story entrance porch. The center wing, on the east side of the courtyard, was a double house at 453 and 455 Madison Avenue, which extended  eastward beyond the end of the north and south wings.

The courtyard was designed both as a symbol of Villard's wealth and as an "urban gesture" to traffic on Madison Avenue. It is flanked by two square posts with ball decorations above them. These posts are connected by a scrolled arch made of wrought iron. A Florentine-style lamp is suspended from the wrought-iron arch. Originally, the courtyard had a fountain surrounded by a circular driveway. The driveway had been arranged to allow horse-drawn vehicles to enter the courtyard easily. The arrangement of residences around a courtyard was similar to the Apostolic Chancery at Vatican City. The Roman Catholic Archdiocese of New York used the courtyard as a parking lot during the mid-20th century. During the construction of the Palace Hotel in the 1970s, a marble and granite medallion was placed in the courtyard.

Facade 

The facade is made of largely unornamented brownstone. While Stanford White of McKim, Mead & White had recommended using granite, Villard had chosen instead to use brownstone. Each house consists of a raised basement, three stories, and an attic topped by a cornice. The houses measure  from the sidewalk to the top of the cornice. The north and south wings have three bays facing Madison Avenue, five facing the courtyard, and seven facing the respective side streets. The center wing has seven bays facing Madison Avenue. In addition, there are horizontal band courses wrapping around each floor under the window sills. Though the complex was not taller than many contemporary townhouses, it appeared imposing because the horizontal lines of the facade were continuous across all of the houses.

The basement and first story of each house is rusticated. The raised basement consists of rectangular openings, above which runs a molding with torus shapes. The first floor has arched windows, which are topped by spandrels with rosette-shaped medallions. The first floor is topped by an architrave with a plain frieze. The ground story of the center wing at 453 and 455 Madison Avenue consists of five arches. The center-wing arches are supported by granite columns. There are decorative medallions above the arches. Behind are the entrances to the center wing, as well as a barrel vault with rosette coffers and decorative moldings.

The ground story of the north and south wings has doorways leading into the courtyard. The north wing at 457 Madison Avenue and the south wing at 451 Madison Avenue have doorways that are accessed by stoops from the courtyard. These entrances have a frieze and cornice above them as well as lamps on either side. The entrances at 451 and 457 Madison Avenue were presented as equal in stature to the center-wing entrances, contrary to traditional houses, where the center entrance would typically be the most imposing one. When the New York Palace Hotel was built in the late 1970s and the south wing was converted to a bar, the former south-wing entrance was turned into an exit-only. The south-wing doorway could not be retained as an "entrance" because, under zoning regulations of the time, the bar entrance would be too close to the Lady chapel behind St. Patrick's Cathedral.

The upper stories are clad with plain stone ashlar. The quoins at the corners of each house are rusticated; these quoins delineated the divisions of the residences. On each of the three stories above the center wing's arches are three pairs of windows. Some of the second-story windows have balconies outside their windows, which are supported by console brackets. The year 1884 is inscribed in Roman numerals on the lintel above one of the windows in the south wing. A plain band course runs above the second floor and a torus-shaped molding runs above the third floor. The attic is designed as a set of small square windows. The dentilled cornice contains an egg-and-dart molding as well as modillions with foliate patterns. The roofs above all these houses are hip roofs with brown tile.

Interior 
McKim, Mead & White was involved in the original decoration of all the interiors, and the firm's principals hired several friends to assist. These included artistic-glass manufacturer John La Farge, sculptor Augustus Saint-Gaudens, painter Francis Lathrop, and mosaic artist David Maitland Armstrong. Leon Marcotte, Sypher and Company, and A. H. Davenport and Company provided some of the furniture. Candace Wheeler may have designed some of the embroidered fabrics, and Ellin & Kitson performed much of the stone carving. Joseph Cabus designed a large portion of the houses' paneling, as suggested by his invoice for the building's woodwork, which was almost $100,000. 

All six residences' interiors were decorated with the highest-quality materials. s constructed, the residences had ornate furniture; for example, Villard's ground-story drawing room was upholstered with a reddish-brown color that harmonized with the color of the room.T he residences were built with 13 bathrooms, each of which contained terrazzo floors and tile and marble walls. Each bedroom was fitted with its own bathroom. The attic story of all of the residences was devoted to servants' rooms, storerooms, and other service facilities. A portion of the mansion is available as an event rental within the New York Palace Hotel.

Main residence 
The most ornate detail was used in Villard's mansion in the south wing. Villard's ground story was the most elaborate, though the upper stories were less so. At ground level, there was a reception vestibule; a drawing-room suite divided into three sections; a music room with a balcony; and a dining room with a pantry. Villard's residence had a billiard room, kitchen, servants' dining room, laundry, and wine room in the basement. The design of Villard's residence, described by architectural historian Leland M. Roth as "a standard of restrained elegance in interior decoration", was the subject of an 1897 handbook published by Edith Wharton.

Ground story 

Entering the south wing from the courtyard, visitors reached the Villard residence's reception vestibule. This vestibule had a set of marble steps and a wall with a tile mosaic band. 

The hallway had three Siena-marble arches sculptured by Saint-Gaudens, as well as a fireplace with a carved marble mantel. The vaulted ceiling of the hallway was also made in Siena marble. Armstrong decorated a mosaic with a foliate pattern on the ceiling. North of the hallway was a grand stairway decorated in golden marble, which led to the second floor. A balustrade overlooks the stairway; each of its balusters has a different design. The hallway also had a small carved-wood elevator door near the reception vestibule, as a minor staircase for guests.

Joseph Cabus designed wooden cabinetry for the space. The drawing rooms had mahogany and white wood finishes, placed upon a light reddish-brown and yellow color scheme. The family of Whitelaw Reid used these drawing rooms as a ballroom during the early 20th century, with green marble columns and a gilded ceiling. The drawing rooms also had ornate marquetry, which Reid subsequently reinstalled in his Purchase, New York, estate. The Women's Military Services Club used the drawing rooms as a lounge in the 1940s. After the opening of the New York Palace Hotel in 1980, it was turned into a cocktail room.

The music room was also known as the Gold Room because the decorations were colored gold. A musicians' balcony was suspended on the north wall. Musicians were able to enter the balcony via a staircase hidden behind the wall. Saint-Gaudens installed five plaster casts on each of the north and south walls, which were copies of "singing angels" that Luca della Robbia designed for the Florence Cathedral. John La Farge designed two lunettes called "Art" and "Music"; these were installed only after Reid moved into the house. La Farge is also credited with designing leaded glass windows on the east wall, above the wainscot. The decoration of the music room was finished only when Reid moved in. It was turned into a cocktail lounge in 1980 but retained its original name. Since 2019, the Gold Room has been a restaurant for the Lotte New York Palace Hotel.

The room had a wall with English oak and white mahogany, a ceiling with English oak beams, and carved friezes with floral designs. Two allegorical fireplace mantels, one at either end of the room, were made of red Verona marble and were carved by Saint-Gaudens. One of the mantels was relocated several times before being installed in the Palace Hotel lobby in 1980. The wall was divided into three sections by red-mahogany pilasters; the upper part of the wall had Villard monograms. An oak partition could be used to divide the room into three segments. The ceiling had paintings of mythological figures designed by Francis Lathrop. The dining room's cornice has inscriptions in Latin. After Reid moved out, the dining room became a meeting room for the Roman Catholic Archdiocese of New York. In 1980, it became a bar within the hotel.

Upper stories 
The upper stories of number 451 had a floor layout similar to the ground story and also contained fireplaces. The second-story hallway had a gilded ceiling, embossed-leather walls, and a large mantelpiece. Adjoining the private music room was a private library fitted in mahogany, with carved medallions on the bookcases. The coffered ceiling contained medallions of publishers and three murals. The second-floor guest bedroom had gold and crimson decorations on the walls and a ceiling with wooden cross beams. A stairway with a wainscoted wall and a decorated balustrade led between the second and third stories of the south wing. The bedrooms on the third floor had chintz wall-hangings and colorful decorations. The Reid family largely retained these design details, as did the Women's Military Services Club.

Other residences 
The other houses were similarly elaborate. The Fahnestock residence in the north wing had a reception hall and a ballroom, the latter of which was subdivided by Random House when it occupied the space in the mid-20th century. A marble stairway also rose to the second floor. A similarly ornate decorative stairway, in the residence of Edward D. Adams (at number 455), was moved to the Brooklyn Museum in the 1970s. The modern main entrance to the New York Palace, within what was formerly the entrance to the center wing, contains a grand staircase down to the main hotel lobby.

The other residences had similarly elaborate decorations on the upper floors. Number 457, the Fahnestock residence in the north wing, had a gold-leaf ceiling and a circular stairway, designed by Stanford White. The oak-clad library of number 457 had ivory buttons with the letters "B" and "M", which once respectively summoned a butler and a maid. In the 1980s, the third story of number 457 was taken by the Urban Center, which had a members' gallery facing the courtyard, as well as a committee room and a staff room. When the eastern section of the north wing was demolished in the 1970s, one room was reconstructed on the third floor of the Palace Hotel.

History

Development

Planning 
The houses were commissioned by Henry Villard, then the president of the Northern Pacific Railway. Villard wanted a building that resembled palaces in his native Bavaria. In April 1881, he bought a plot on the east side of Madison Avenue between 50th and 51st Streets, from the trustees of St. Patrick's Cathedral. At the time, what is now the Park Avenue railroad line ran in a trench directly behind the site, and Park Avenue itself was still known as Fourth Avenue. Charles Follen McKim of McKim, Mead & White was hired to design a group of houses for Villard, arranged around a courtyard with a fountain and garden. The commission arose from personal connections; McKim was one of Villard's family friends, and Villard's brother-in-law and McKim's sister were married. The Real Estate Record and Guide speculated that the mansions were arranged to "secure privacy and get rid of tramps, and to live in a quiet and secluded way", similar to dwellings arranged around courtyards in the suburbs of London and Paris.

Details of the design were revised through October 1881, when McKim temporarily left New York City to work on a railroad terminal for Villard in Portland, Oregon. The job was reassigned to Stanford White who, after a short time, left the city to visit his brother in New Mexico. White then reassigned his projects to various junior architects in his office. Joseph M. Wells agreed to take over the Villard design on the condition that the firm's remaining partner, William Rutherford Mead, allowed him to completely redesign the exterior, retaining only the general layout of the houses. According to Leland Roth, one account had it that McKim and White had "immediately [became] advocates of Renaissance classicism" upon returning and seeing the updated plans. Roth wrote that McKim and White were probably responsible for the general style of the facade, although Wells was definitely responsible for the architectural details. White's original architectural drawings no longer exist.

Early construction 
By November 1881, excavation of existing buildings was underway at the northeast corner of Madison Avenue and 50th Street. The site was drilled until the underlying layer of bedrock was exposed, since Villard did not want to damage Columbia College's buildings nearby. In May 1882, McKim, Mead & White submitted plans to the Bureau of Buildings for a four-story residence at the corner of Madison Avenue and 50th Street, measuring 100 by 60 feet. This was to be the first of a series of six residences surrounding a courtyard. By late 1882, the houses' exteriors had been completed and parts of the interiors were being furnished.

So large did the residences appear that the public assumed Villard could only occupy the center wing, with a kindergarten and school in one of the side wings and a gymnasium, theater, and ballroom in the other side wing. One residence on the north wing, the unit with a doorway facing the courtyard, was to have been occupied by Villard's adviser Horace White, but this did not happen. According to a later New York Times article, Villard had planned the entire complex as his own residence, but he was obligated to split it into multiple smaller units when his wealth declined.

Villard obtained a mortgage loan for the property from the Manhattan Savings Institution in late 1882. One of the three wings, likely Villard's own residence in the south wing, had been built by mid-1883. Villard directed McKim, Mead & White to design the interiors of each individual residence; at the time, most residences were laid out by interior designers and decorators rather than architecture firms. The interiors of the other residences in the group were designed according to the tastes of the residents. Villard's residence itself cost $1 million without furnishing (equivalent to about $ million in ), and the decoration cost another $250,000 (about $ million in ). Stanford White was proud of the project, recalling in 1896 that it was "the beginning of any good work that we may have done".

Villard bankruptcy and completion 
Villard fell into bankruptcy just before the houses were completed. He moved into his mansion in December 1883 on the same day that he resigned from the Oregon and Transcontinental Company.  In late December 1883, Villard transferred two of the other lots next to his residence to his legal advisers Edward D. Adams and Artemas H. Holmes.  According to Horace White, the transfers were made on the condition that Holmes and Adams construct residences similar in style to his own residence. Adams lived at 455 Madison Avenue while Holmes lived at 453 Madison Avenue. The same month, Villard's own mansion was transferred to trustees William Crowninshield Endicott and Horace White to pay off a $300,000 debt. The trustees oversaw the completion of the remaining houses around the courtyard.

With the bankruptcy proceedings taking place, a crowd protested in the courtyard in early 1884, in the belief that all the houses around the yard belonged to Villard. The Villard family moved out of the residence that May, traveling to Dobbs Ferry, New York, after having lived on Madison Avenue for only a few weeks. Work on the houses continued until 1885, and Villard's finances had recovered by January 1886. William Endicott and Horace White were listed as having substantially completed the Villard Houses, which were transferred for a nominal sum to his wife Fannie Garrison Villard. The residence at 457 Madison Avenue was then sold to Harris C. Fahnestock, who along with Adams was a banker with the firm Winslow, Lanier & Co. Fahnestock had waited several months to obtain number 457, but the trustees had refused to sell the property until all the other houses except for Villard's residence had been rented. The rear residences on 24 and 26 East 51st Street were sold to other members of the Fahnestock family.

Also in 1886, the Villard residence itself was purchased in 1886 by Elisabeth Mills Reid, wife of New-York Tribune editor Whitelaw Reid. The Reid family had purchased 451 Madison Avenue for $400,000, half of what Villard had paid to build that house. Stanford White redecorated the public rooms with such decorations as glass-and-onyx panels. The residence at 24 East 51st Street was purchased by Scribner's Monthly publisher Roswell Smith. Babb, Cook & Willard designed an expansion at number 24 in 1886. The expansion, which was finished by 1892, consisted of an "L"-shaped stairway leading to a double-arched entrance porch.

Residential use 

Roswell Smith died at 24 East 51st Street in 1892, and his estate sold 24 and 26 East 51st Street two years later to Catherine L. and Charles W. Wells for about $80,000. Businessman E. H. Harriman was living in the north wing by 1899, when The New York Times reported on his involvement in the Harriman Alaska expedition. In the first decades of the 20th century, many of the Villard Houses' residents remained in place, even when residential neighborhoods further uptown became more fashionable. The Wells family continued to retain ownership of 24 East 51st Street until 1909, when the house was given to B. Crystal & Son as a partial payment for an apartment building in Washington Heights, Manhattan. At the time, the Reid, Holmes, Adams, and Fahnestock families still lived in the other residences. Harris Fahnestock bought number 24 from B. Crystal & Son in 1910. In that year's United States census, Fahnestock was recorded as living at number 457 with his grandson Snowden.

Next door, the Reid family erected a seven- or eight-story addition east of number 451 in 1909. The next year, McKim, Mead & White designed alterations to number 451, including new elevators. By 1916, number 453 was leased to William Sloane. At that point, the residences were known as Cathedral Court because they faced St. Patrick's Cathedral. The following year, number 453 was in the process of being sold. Elisabeth Reid acquired the house, loaning it during World War I to the American Red Cross. Reid hired Raymond Hood in 1920 to make alterations to number 453. The 1920 United States census recorded Reid as living at number 451 with seventeen servants.

In March 1922, the estate of Mrs. Edward D. Adams sold the house at number 455. At this point, the southern half of the Villard Houses was owned by Reid and the north wing by Harris Fahnestock's children William Fahnestock and Helen Campbell. At that time, Charles Platt combined two of the units in the northern wing. The Fahnestocks continued to live at number 457 until 1929. Helen Campbell, who married John Hubbard in 1929, intended to continue living at 24 East 51st Street for the rest of her life. Helen's daughter, also named Helen, lived at number 455 with her husband Clarence Gaylor Michalis and their children. In 1932, William Fahnestock financed his portion of the property with a $130,000 mortgage from the First National Bank. The next year, John Hubbard died at number 24. Meanwhile, following Reid's 1931 death, the furnishings in number 451 were sold during a several-day-long auction in May 1934. The auction drew thousands of people to the Reid residence.

Commercial conversion and preservation

1940s to 1960s 
The Reid family lent number 451 to the Coordinating Council of French Relief Societies in March 1942. The following May, the Women's Military Services Club opened its clubhouse in the interior of number 451, and the French Relief Societies moved across the courtyard to number 457. At the opening of the Military Services Club, New York City mayor Fiorello La Guardia declared, "You won't see any more private mansions like this. You'll see more wholesome houses for more people." Robert J. Marony acquired number 457 for around $200,000 in June 1944. The government of the United States had to approve the sale because three Fahnestock heirs were overseas in internment camps during World War II. Title to number 457 was transferred to Joseph P. Kennedy, former U.S. ambassador to the United Kingdom, in April 1945. The transaction also showed that Kennedy obtained a  interest at 453-455 Madison Avenue. Kennedy ended up never living there, and it continued to be occupied by the French Relief Societies. There was also an unsuccessful plan to place the temporary headquarters of the United Nations in the Villard Houses.

The Women's Military Services Club closed in January 1946 after the end of World War II, having served 200,000 people. Number 457, as well as a one-third interest in the courtyard, was acquired the same year by publishing company Random House, which renovated the residence into its own offices. Random House's publisher Bennett Cerf bought the house for $450,000, believing that to be the price Kennedy had paid. The Archdiocese of New York purchased the houses at 451 and 453 Madison Avenue and 29 East 50th Street in October 1948 for an unknown amount in cash. The residences, which had been vacant for three years, had an assessed value of $825,000. The archdiocese needed space for its various agencies near St. Patrick's Cathedral, and the agencies' old headquarters had been sold to make way for the office structure at 488 Madison Avenue. The archdiocese also purchased 455 Madison Avenue and 24 and 30 East 51st Street, as well as the vacant lot at 26-28 East 51st Street, in January 1949; these properties were valued at $600,000. Francis Cardinal Spellman dedicated the archdiocese's offices at 451 and 453 Madison Avenue that May.

During the early 1950s, the archdiocese hired Voorhees, Walker, Foley & Smith to renovate its office space, though this was not carried out. Helen Fahnestock Hubbard continued to reside at 24 East 51st Street until she died overseas in 1955. The archdiocese then rented number 24 to the Capital Cities Broadcasting Corporation, which was headquartered there. Random House subleased the first story of number 24 in 1960 from the Capital Cities Broadcasting Corporation.

By the late 1960s, Random House owned number 457 and the Archdiocese of New York owned all of the other houses. Random House leased space at an under-construction skyscraper at 825 Third Avenue in 1967. The company initially intended to keep space at 457 Madison Avenue, but it decided to relocate entirely the following August, when Cerf called the residence "too valuable to keep". By then, there were rumors that developers wanted to raze the houses and replace them with a skyscraper. The late Cardinal Spellman's successor Terence Cardinal Cooke had not made a public statement about the houses, but Monsignor James Rigney said: "At some point we would have to wonder whether we are justified in keeping property as valuable as this." On September 30, 1968, the New York City Landmarks Preservation Commission (LPC) designated the complex as official landmarks, preventing them from being modified without the LPC's permission.

1970s 

In 1970, Richard Ottinger leased the old Random House mansion for his U.S. Senate campaign's offices. Architectural writer Ada Louise Huxtable said the entire complex was in danger of being redeveloped if the archdiocese were to gain control of the Random House residence and thus full control of the land. After the archdiocese received $2.25 million from Gillette CEO Henry Jacques Gaisman, it purchased number 457 in early 1971. According to the archdiocese's real-estate adviser John J. Reynolds, the archdiocese wanted to preserve the houses so there would be open space in front of St. Patrick's Cathedral. Later in 1971, the archdiocese announced it would move to 1011 First Avenue by the following year and would lease out the Villard Houses. When the new archdiocesan headquarters opened in November 1973, the archdiocese said it hoped to find a lessee for the Villard Houses rather than sell them.

In early 1974, the archdiocese was negotiating with developer Harry Helmsley to sell him the air rights above the Villard Houses. Helmsley planned to build a 50-story hotel tower next to or above the houses. By late 1974, the archdiocese had leased the Villard Houses to Helmsley for 99 years at around $1 million per year. An early plan for the hotel called for demolishing the rear of the houses and gutting much of the interior, including the Gold Room. Following objections, Helmsley presented a modified plan in June 1975, which still called for demolishing part of the rear and interior. The houses were placed on the National Register of Historic Places on September 2, 1975, which prevented federal funds from being used to demolish any part of the houses unless the federal government approved it. The same month, Helmsley presented a modified proposal that preserved the Gold Room.

The archdiocese hired William Shopsin in January 1976 to conduct a historical survey of the Villard Houses. Shopsin recorded the houses' existing design components for the Historic American Buildings Survey. After further delays, Helmsley's 51-story hotel was approved in late 1976. In early 1977, Emery Roth & Son hired James W. Rhodes as an architectural consultant for the project. In the two and a half years before construction started, the archdiocese had been obliged to pay $800,000 per year in taxes because the vacant houses were no longer tax-exempt. Helmsley had paid half of this cost.

A groundbreaking ceremony for the hotel occurred on January 25, 1978.  The decorative interiors of the Villard Houses were placed into temporary storage, and the hotel's developer took precautions to limit damage to the Villard Houses. Interior designer Sarah Lee was largely responsible for the redesign of the historical interiors. The Gold Room was renovated and turned into a cocktail lounge, while the old library was refurbished with 4,000 false books. The old drawing room of the south wing was redesigned as a cocktail lounge as well, while the old dining room became the hotel's Hunt Bar. The facade and courtyard were also restored, though the easternmost section of the complex, including much of the central wing and the additions on 50th and 51st Streets, was demolished. The project even involved replacing some city streetlights outside the Villard Houses. One of the houses' roofs was damaged in October 1979 when a heavy object fell through it.

Later use 
Helmsley leased  in the Villard House's north wing to Jacqueline Kennedy Onassis in June 1979. The space was to contain the Urban Center, the headquarters of four civic organizations: the American Institute of Architects, the Architectural League of New York, the Municipal Art Society (MAS), and the Parks Council of New York.  Two months later, Capital Cities Communications leased space in the hotel tower.

1980s and 1990s 
James Stewart Polshek and Associates renovated the north wing for the Urban Center. The carved cornice and parquet floors of the north wing were restored, but the reception rooms were repainted and lighted for the new tenants. The Urban Center's space opened in August 1980. The hotel opened the next month. An architecture bookstore run by MAS opened in the north wing in October 1980; the store's first exhibition was about the Villard Houses themselves. The second floor was used for exhibitions, the third and fifth floors were used for the organizations, and the first and fourth floors were rented as commercial space. The Urban Center's offices were rearranged from 1981 to 1982 because the original layout was inefficient. The ground story of the south wing had a cocktail lounge in the former drawing room, a bar in the former dining room, and the Gold Room in the same place as before.

Fashion boutique Celine of Paris leased a  space in the north wing in 1981. During the late 1980s and early 1990s, Steven Hoffenberg hired Jeffrey Epstein as a consultant for Towers Financial Corporation, which had offices at the Villard Houses; the corporation subsequently became known as one of the biggest Ponzi schemes in American history.

In late 1993, the houses and the New York Palace Hotel were sold to the Sultan of Brunei for $202 million. The land remained the property of the Archdiocese of New York under a 99-year lease. Two and a half years later, Amedeo hired Lee Jablin of Harman Jablin Architects for a renovation of the hotel and Villard Houses. Jablin would redesign the lobby in the Villard Houses, while the restaurant Le Cirque would take up the Gold Room and other rooms in the south wing. The new Le Cirque location opened in April 1997. Adam D. Tihany designed the Le Cirque space with multicolored coverings over the previous interiors. Le Cirque was replaced by another restaurant, Gilt, in 2005.

2000s to present 
The owners of the Palace Hotel renovated the brownstone facade for $300,000 in late 2003. At the time, James W. Rhodes estimated that 99 percent of the facade's original brownstone remained; some of the pieces for the restoration had come from the demolished rear portions of the houses. The MAS held a discounted lease for the space in the north wing until 2006; when the discount expired, the organization had the option to pay market rates for another 24 years. MAS paid $175,000 in rent annually at the time, but it was already considering relocating. The organization moved out of the Villard Houses in 2010. The building stood vacant afterward, and the Palace Hotel's owners wanted to incorporate the Villard Houses into a portion of the hotel.

In 2011, the hotel was sold to Northwood Investors, which extensively renovated the hotel and the Villard Houses. In 2014, the residences hosted the annual Kips Bay Decorator Show House program to raise money for the Kips Bay Boys & Girls Club. The same year, menswear retailer Trunk Club leased the north wing. Lotte New York Palace Hotel rented out some of the rooms in the southern residence in 2016. A restaurant named Villard opened within the Villard mansion the same year. In 2017, the Archdiocese of New York mortgaged the land under the Lotte New York Palace Hotel and the Villard Houses for $100 million to pay settlements to Catholic sexual abuse victims. The Gold Room restaurant was opened in 2019 within the room of the same name.

Critical reception 
At least initially, the Real Estate Record criticized the project, saying: "There is no composition attempted, no grouping of the openings [...] no effort to express the interior, nothing indeed to indicate architecture except the delicacy of some of the detail..." At the houses' completion, the British magazine The Architect said the Villard residence "will be the most magnificent residence building in the [United] States, far surpassing the Vanderbilt houses" along Fifth Avenue nearby. A critic for the Real Estate Record characterized the Villard Houses as "a mild success". Despite the building being "big and tiresome and as unnoticeable as so big a pile can be", the houses were "in no way offensive and can never come to look trivial or vulgar". Another article for the same publication described the Villard residence in particular as "the only example of consistent adherence to one style" in New York City. The New York Evening Post said the residences differed "from anything in the city" and were a departure from the château-style residences elsewhere in the city.

In subsequent years, the design of the Villard Houses continued to be praised. The Christian Science Monitor wrote in 1934 that the buildings retained "the same dignity that accompanied them in 1883" and that their construction had spurred the start of interior decoration. Ada Louise Huxtable described the buildings in 1968 as "one of the best buildings New York could and can claim, then or now". The New York Times reported in 1971, "The complex has long been regarded as one of New York City's architectural treasures." Even so, the houses remained relatively nondescript through the late 20th century. Harmon Goldstone and Martha Dalrymple wrote in a 1974 book: "It is a minor miracle that this magnificent architectural island still survives in the center of midtown Manhattan." Architectural writer Robert A. M. Stern described the Villard Houses as McKim, Mead & White's "first scholarly essay in the Classical architecture of the Italian Renaissance".

During the 1970s, when the Palace Hotel was being developed, preservationists fought strongly to keep the houses. Huxtable had called Helmsley's 1974 proposal for the Palace hotel "a death-dealing rather than a life-giving 'solution'", and she had similarly criticized the June 1975 plan, saying: "By any measure except computerized investment design, the results are a wretched failure." By contrast, when the September 1975 proposal called for saving the Gold Room, Huxtable stated: "There is now the promise of a solution that all can abide by." Though many preservationists were not completely content about the Palace Hotel's placement behind the Villard Houses, Helmsley was nevertheless credited with saving the houses. In 1981, the AIA Journal described the project as " a product of admirable human energy and down-to-earth compromise and [...] a much happier event than the architectural funeral most observers would have bet on six years ago".

See also
 List of New York City Designated Landmarks in Manhattan from 14th to 59th Streets
 National Register of Historic Places listings in Manhattan from 14th to 59th Streets

References

Notes

Citations

Sources

Further reading

 

Houses completed in 1884
Houses in Manhattan
Madison Avenue
McKim, Mead & White buildings
Midtown Manhattan
New York City Designated Landmarks in Manhattan
Residential buildings on the National Register of Historic Places in Manhattan
Renaissance Revival architecture in New York City
Gilded Age mansions